Aata is a 2011 Indian Kannada-language masala film directed by B N Vijaykumar and written by Shashank. It stars Sumanth Shailendra and Vibha Natarajan in lead roles.

Plot 
Rahul is a football player, who lives with his close-knit middle-class family consisting of his mother, father and sister Sandhya. Due to some mix-up in a CD shop, Rahul comes across a video of Swathi, the daughter of a rich business tycoon Rajashekhar and Rahul's football rival Vikram's sister. After some initial misunderstandings, the duo bond well and decide to marry, but Rahul wants the approval of their parents before they take the plunge. Meanwhile, Sandhya elopes with her boyfriend just on the day of her marriage and this completely shatters his family members. During this, Swathi stays in Rahul's house posing as Sandhya's friend as Rajashekhar fixed her marriage with her friend's son. Learning that Swathi has fallen for someone, Rajashekhar hires Shankar, a contract killer to finish Swathi's love interest (Rahul). Rahul decides to receive Swathi's parents approval for their proposal and enters into their house, where he bonds with the rest of the family. However, Shankar soon finds Rahul and reports it to Rajashekhar, who angrily throws Rahul out of the house and takes Swathi away. After many efforts, Rahul and Swathi kill Shankar in a fight and they finally receive their parents' approval and get married happily.

Cast
 Sumanth Shailendra as Rahul
 Vibha Natarajan as Swathi
 Pradeep as Vikram
 Avinash as Rajashekhar, Swathi's father
 Padmaja Rao as Rahul's mother
 Achyuth Kumar as Rahul's father
 Pavithra Lokesh as Swathi's mother
 Sadhu Kokila as a football coach
 Shankar Rao as Shankar

Music

Critical response 
The New Indian Express wrote "Sadhu Kokila has tried his best to tickle funny bones of audience but has failed miserably. It is worth watching if you have patience to cope with its lengthy climax." News18 India wrote "Raaghav has done a commendable job behind the camera. Kokila's music is the major attraction of the film. All the veteran artists, including Avinash, Neenasam Achyutha, and Padmaja Rao, have done well in their roles. But the film mainly suffers because of bad narration." BSS from Deccan Herald wrote "Suchendra Prasad’s voice lends menace to the ‘villain’ Shankar. Avinash, Padmaja Rao and Achyut Kumar are all cast well. Shashank’s story keeps the audience engrossed but the lengthy climax jars a bit. This Aata is interesting." The Times of India scored the film at 3.5 out of 5 stars and wrote "While Vibha Natarajan is brilliant, Avinash gives life to the role. Padmaja Rao, Achuth Kumar, Pavithra Lokesh and Shankar have done justice to their characters. Music by Sadhu Kokila and cinematography by N Raghav are good. Dialogues by Raghucharan are catchy." Bangalore Mirror wrote  "Sumanth is not a bad actor, but not charming enough for the silver screen.   Vibha looks cute at times — and scary when she opens her eyes wide. Sadhu Kokila's music is passable. His comedy track is also not up to the standard hehas set for himself. N Raghav's (from across the border) camera work is good, the locations are solid, the overall richness is good, but the film is far from it."

References

2010s Kannada-language films
2011 films